Lita Liem Sugiarto (born 27 February 1946), sometimes known by her maiden name Lita Liem, a former Indonesian professional tennis player. She played at Grand Slam events between 1968 and 1975, in women's singles, women's doubles and mixed doubles.

In women's doubles, she and partner Lany Kaligis reached two Grand Slam quarterfinals: the Australian Open in 1970 and Wimbledon in 1971. As such, she and Kaligis were among the first Indonesians to reach the later rounds of a Grand Slam competition. Kaligis was the only partner that Sugiarto ever played with in Grand Slam doubles competition.

In singles, her best results were her third round exits from the Australian Championships in 1968, the Australian Open in 1970, Wimbledon in 1972 and the French Open in 1974.

At the 1966 Asian Games at Bangkok, she won the bronze medal in the women's singles, the gold medal in the women's doubles with Lany Kaligis, and the bronze medal in the mixed doubles with Sutarjo Sugiarto. She won the gold medal in the women's singles at the 1974 Asian Games in Tehran.

She was part of Indonesia's Fed Cup team in 1969, 1970, 1973, 1974, 1975, 1978, 1979, 1980 and 1981.

ITF finals

Singles (10–6)

Doubles (16–6)

Grand Slam singles performance timeline

Grand Slam doubles performance timeline

External links
 
 
 

Indonesian female tennis players
1946 births
Living people
Asian Games medalists in tennis
Tennis players at the 1966 Asian Games
Tennis players at the 1974 Asian Games
Tennis players at the 1978 Asian Games
Asian Games gold medalists for Indonesia
Asian Games bronze medalists for Indonesia
Indonesian people of Chinese descent
Medalists at the 1966 Asian Games
Medalists at the 1974 Asian Games
Medalists at the 1978 Asian Games
Southeast Asian Games gold medalists for Indonesia
Southeast Asian Games bronze medalists for Indonesia
Southeast Asian Games medalists in tennis
Competitors at the 1977 Southeast Asian Games
20th-century Indonesian women